Mustafa Lleshi Street is a pedestrian only street in Tirana, the capital of Albania. It is named after Mustafa Lleshi, a World War II Albanian hero.

History

Prior to the 1990s, the area was largely villas, fields, and fruit orchards. With the reintroduction of private property in Albania, many villas were sold and demolished to build apartment buildings. The area has retained several of the older villas, though they remain hidden behind walls, shrubs and vines. Cars were not common in those times, and as such the introduction of cars has led to the removal of sidewalks in the area, but Mustafa Lleshi Street has remained a pedestrian only walkway.

The student protests of 1990 followed Mustafa Lleshi Street into the city center.

At the intersection of Pjeter Budi Street and Mustafa Lleshi Street, there once stood a giant olive tree, and the corner was known as "Ulliri" (Olive in English).  Many people today still know the area by this name, although have never seen the tree.

It is said that prior to 1990, residents could list every neighbour living within the vicinity by first name.

Use

It begins at the Elbasan Street and continues as a pedestrian only walkway until merging with Pjetër Budi Street, which continues to the Student City. It is a major pedestrian thoroughfare, and is also used by cyclists and motorcycles.

It is a narrow walkway, yet is traveled by thousands of people daily, mostly young people.  Before and after weekends and holidays, the street is often full of students wheeling suitcases back and forth from their homes outside of Tirana and their home in Tirana at the Student City and beyond to Farke.

Shops

Food and drink shops consist of byrek stands, fruit markets, pizza and fast food, cafes, pubs, bakeries and mini markets. Clothing and accessory shops are abundant, and range from used vintage clothing to modern and trendy fashions, shoes, jewelry, perfume and cosmetics. There are also sports-bets and computer services, as well as pharmacies, tailors, general repairs shops, artist studios and an arts management studio.

Most businesses remain open all week from 9am-9pm, however some do close on Sunday, and hours can be sporadic.

Getting around

Parking is available at the start of the street, at the Elbasan Street. Taxis, as well as Mini-vans travelling from Korçë, Pogradec and Elbasan wait close to the intersection of Mustafa Lleshi Street and the Elbasan Street, while city buses pass by regularly. Cycling is a popular way to get around, and the area is within easy walking distance of Skanderbeg Square, Qemal Stafa Stadium, The ish-Blloku and the Student City.

Mustafa Lleshi Street intersects with Xhavit Shyqyri Demneri Street, Pjetër Budi Street and Elbasan Street.

Municipal and State service issues

Like elsewhere in Tirana, residents suffer from lack of, or poor services. Despite the number of people using the street, it remains in a state of disrepair, and waste removal is minimal. Residents have done much of the repairs themselves, including digging up and repairing water pipes and re-paving sections. Public service invoices and bills are often left by government workers at mini markets and cafes instead of being personally delivered to residents.

Many local businesses and residents have begun placing their own waste bins for pedestrians, and have begun a neighbourhood campaign to educate passers-by on proper waste disposal.

Public Art

At the upper section of the street, a series of public artworks have been made by local and visiting artists.

Name change controversy

In the spring of 2010, Tirana officials began ordering that all streets must have visible name signs. Without warning or consultation with the community, a large section of Mustafa Lleshi Street was changed to Xhavit Shyqyri Demneri Street, forcing residents to re-submit all property documents for updating. Many residents now living on Xhavit Shyqyri Demneri still refer to their street as Mustafa Lleshi.

Some residents have proposed that the street should be renamed as Rruga Besim Zekthi, a celebrated dancer and People's Artist of Albania from the area, as the war hero Mustafa Lleshi has nothing to do with the neighborhood.

Notable residents

Besim Zekthi - Dancer, Artist of the People
Ferid Berberi - Former Weightlifter

Streets in Tirana
Pedestrian malls